The Gonbad-e Sorkh (means The Red Dome) is the name of a historical building in Maragheh, Iran, built in 1147 AD (542 AH) in the Seljuq dynasty period. The architectural style of this building is Razi style. The Gonbad-e Sorkh is one of the oldest buildings of the Islamic period in the East Azerbaijan Province, which is located in the southwestern part of the city of Maragheh and it is one of the most important historical monuments of this city. The name of the founder of the building and the date of its construction can be seen from the inscription of the northern front and the name of its builder can be seen from the western inscription.

History
The Gonbad-e Sorkh has seven inscriptions. From the inscriptions in this building, it is understood that the building of the Gonbad-e Sorkh (Red Dome) was built in 1147 AD (542 AH) by the order of "Abdul Aziz Ibn Mahmoud Ibn Saad Yadim", the president of Azerbaijan during the Seljuq dynasty period, and architectured by "Bani Bakr Mohammad Ibn Bandan Ibn Mohsen Memar".

Cultural heritage experts believe that this building was used before the Maragheh observatory to determine the months of the year and the hours of the day, and the holes created on the sides of this building indicate this. The building was registered as one of the Iran National Heritage on 6 January 1932 with the registration number 134.

The Gonbad-e Sorkh (Red Dome) is the oldest of the five tombs in Maragheh, and despite the existence of legible inscriptions, it is not clear who owns the tomb under the dome.

Architecture
The Gonbad-e Sorkh is the last building which constructed in Razi style in Iranian architecture history. Razi style is a style in Iranian architecture and is related to the fifth to the beginning of the seventh Hijri lunar century (Samanid Empire, Seljuk Empire and Khwarazmian dynasty). The building also has some Azeri architecture theme so it is the turning point and the beginning of Azeri architecture, which is a combination of bricks and tiles and the use of tiles in decorating historical buildings in Iran.

The Gonbad-e Sorkh is a square building with 2 floors consisting of a crypt and a main room which is located on a stone platform and can be accessed by seven rows of stairs. The height of seven steps from the surrounding area is about 1.50 meters. Five steps are located in front of the platform and the sixth and seventh steps are part of the gate threshold. The crypt is located in the middle of the platform and can be accessed from the eastern front. The tombstone is in the crypt. The entrance to the Gonbad-e Sorkh, which faces north, consists of a tall and beautiful gate adorned with delicate brickwork and delicate turquoise tiles, which had just become common in Seljuk architecture. In the center of this brickwork is an inscription in Kufic script. In the four outer corners of the building, there are circular columns with brick decorations that help the building stand. The substructure is made of cut stone.

This dome has 4 sides as a square with dimensions of 8.4 meters from outside and 5.95 meters from inside and its height is about 10 meters, the inscription on the north side indicates the name and titles of the founder of the dome and the date of construction of the building, and the inscription on the east and south sides contain the Quranic verses and the west side indicate the name of the architect. This building has a two-covered dome, the outer pyramidal cover of which has collapsed and only the inner dome remains. Therefore, it can be considered as a memorial tower. According to German orientalist Eric Schurder, the building is a masterpiece of world architecture in terms of brickwork.

Gallery

Bibliography
In Persian:

See also
 Maragheh observatory
 Babak Fort
 Sa'at Tower

References

External links
 Gonbad-e Sorkh of Maragheh review by Tripyar
 Gonbad-e Sorkh, Maragheh in Inspirok
 Gonbad-e Sorkh Picture Review
 Gonbad-e-Sorkh on GoogleMap
 The Symbology of Swastika in the Gonbad-e Sorkh Tomb
 Gonbad-e-Sorkh in Maragheh, Tabriz, Iran on Pinterest
 Gonbad-e Sorkh review in Tripadvisor

Maragheh
Religious buildings and structures completed in 1147
Buildings and structures in East Azerbaijan Province
National works of Iran
Architecture in Iran
2nd-millennium establishments in Iran